Harold Fitzgerald Hogue (born November 13, 1967) is an American retired professional wrestler. He is best known for his tenure with World Championship Wrestling, where he wrestled under the ring names Ice Train and M. I. Smooth.

Professional wrestling career

World Championship Wrestling (1993–1994) 
On the July 7, 1993 edition of WorldWide, Hogue made his World Championship Wrestling debut under the ring name Ice Train by winning a handicap match. He later made his pay-per-view debut at the first-ever Fall Brawl event, where he defeated Shanghai Pierce. Hogue then teamed up with The Shockmaster and Charlie Norris and defeated Harlem Heat and The Equalizer at Halloween Havoc. However, Hogue's undefeated streak was broken after losing to Ron Simmons at Clash of the Champions on January 27, 1994.

Catch Wrestling Association (1994–1996) 
Hogue wrestled for the Catch Wrestling Association from 1994 to 1995, and again in 1996. He won the Catch Cup 1995 tournament defeating John Hawk in the Finals.

Return to World Championship Wrestling (1996–1997)

Fire and Ice (1996) 
After being absent from WCW for the rest of 1994 and all of 1995, Hogue returned to WCW on the February 14, 1996 edition of Saturday Night in a match against Scott Norton. The match ended in a double countout when both men clotheslined each other, knocking themselves out in the process. After the match, the two shook hands and Norton declared to announcer Gene Okerlund that he and Ice Train would become a formidable tag team because of their similar in-ring styles. The team was quickly named Fire and Ice with Norton representing "Fire" and Ice Train eponymously representing "Ice". The team easily overpowered numerous teams as they tried to establish themselves as a legitimate contender for the World Tag Team Championship. At Slamboree: Lord of the Ring, Ice Train and Norton were "randomly selected" to be on the same team and they easily defeated the makeshift team of "Big" Bubba Rogers and Stevie Ray in the first round of the Lethal Lottery tournament. After winning their match, both Ice Train and Norton advanced to the final round and competed in an eight-man battle royal, but neither was successful as Diamond Dallas Page eliminated both men and went on to win the Lethal Lottery tournament, earning a title shot in the process.

Soon afterward, Fire and Ice began feuding with Norton's longtime rivals, The Steiner Brothers. After wrestling to a double countout on two separate occasions, the two teams faced off at the Great American Bash on June 16 to determine who would become the number one contenders to the WCW World Tag Team Championship. Scott Steiner pinned Norton after a Frankensteiner to earn the win for his team as well as the number one contendership. After the loss, Fire and Ice continued feuding with the Steiners, with the two powerhouse teams trying to prove who was best. After a sudden loss to The Rock 'n' Roll Express on an episode of Main Event before Bash at the Beach, dissension started to appear between Fire and Ice as Norton attacked Ice Train after another team loss. The team finally imploded when Norton faced and defeated Ice Train at Hog Wild on August 10 in a submission match after Norton made Ice Train submit to an armbar. However, Ice Train defeated Norton in a submission rematch on September 15 at Fall Brawl, when Norton submitted to a full nelson.

Singles competition (1996–1997) 
After the implosion of Fire and Ice, Ice Train returned to singles competition in a loss to Diamond Dallas Page on the November 4, 1996 edition of Nitro and lost a rematch to Page on the following week's edition of Nitro. Ice Train then competed at World War 3, eliminating Mark Starr and Villano IV and  even made it into the final ten, but he was eliminated from the match due to the combined efforts of Kevin Nash and Diamond Dallas Page. After World War 3, Ice Train returned to the undercard and gained Theodore Long as his manager for a very brief period. Ice Train began easily defeating opponents on Nitro and he soon became a mainstay on Pro. However, he soon continued his undercard role on WorldWide as well as on Thunder.

Return to Catch Wrestling Association (1997–1998)
Hogue returned to the Catch Wrestling Association in 1997. He competed in the CWA Internationaler Catch Cup '98.

Second Return to World Championship Wrestling (2000–2001) 
In mid-2000, Hogue was again pushed into the spotlight as he became a member of The New Blood faction, who feuded with the Millionaire's Club. Hogue was renamed "M. I. Smooth" and served as Commissioner Ernest Miller's personal limo driver. Smooth regularly appeared in segments with various members of the New Blood. In early 2001, Smooth began a minor feud with Kanyon by brawling with him. On the March 19, 2001 edition of Nitro, Kanyon defeated Smooth. However, Smooth gained revenge two days later on Thunder as he teamed up with Ernest "The Cat" Miller to defeat Kanyon and Road Warrior Animal. Five days later, WCW broadcast its final edition of Nitro due to the company being bought out by the World Wrestling Federation, although Hogue would not be affected as he retired from wrestling soon after the merger.

Return to Wrestling (2019) 
At 52 years and after 18 years of inactivity, Ice Train returned to wrestling for a one night appearance in Hannover, Germany for European Wrestling Promotion on December 21, 2019 where he fought Dave Taylor in a non contest.

Personal life 
Hogue helped train Toney Freeman for his career in bodybuilding.

Championships and accomplishments 
Catch Wrestling Association
Catch Cup (1995)
Pro Wrestling Illustrated
PWI ranked him #221 of the best 500 singles wrestlers in the PWI 500 in 1993

References

External links 
 
 

1967 births
21st-century African-American people
20th-century African-American sportspeople
African-American male professional wrestlers
American male professional wrestlers
Living people
People from Atlanta
Professional wrestlers from Georgia (U.S. state)